Reckless Kelly Was Here is a live CD/DVD by Reckless Kelly. It is the band's second live album and the first to include a DVD.

Track listing

Disc One
"Sixgun" - 7:27
"Castanets" - 4:46 (Alejandro Escovedo cover)
"Motel Cowboy Show" - 6:03
"I Still Do" - 3:20
"1952 Vincent Black Lightning - 5:30 (Richard Thompson cover)
"Seven Nights in Eire" - 3:15
"Break My Heart Tonight" - 3:38
"Nobody's Girl" - 3:12
"Hey Say May/Guacamole" - 6:24
"Vancouver" - 4:02

Disc Two
"Wiggles & Ritalin" - 2:47
"Wild Western Windblown Band" - 2:55
"Baby's Gone Blues" - 4:17
"Wicked Twisted Road - 5:14
"Crazy Eddie's Last Hurrah" - 7:01
"Revolution" - 9:57 (The Beatles cover)
"Break My Heart Tonight" [Studio Version] - 3:43
"Wiggles & Ritalin" [Studio Version] - 2:47

DVD
"Sixgun"
"Castanets" 
"Motel Cowboy Show" 
"I Still Do" 
"1952 Vincent Black Lightning"
"Seven Nights in Eire" 
"Break My Heart Tonight"  	 
"Nobody's Girl"  
"Hey Say May/Guacamole"
"Vancouver"
"Wiggles & Ritalin"
"Wild Western Windblown Band" 	
"Baby's Gone Blues" 
"Wicked Twisted Road" 	 
"Crazy Eddie's Last Hurrah"

Radio Singles
"Break My Heart Tonight"— peaked at #6 on the Texas Music Chart

Chart positions

References

Reckless Kelly (band) albums
2006 live albums